Megachilini is a tribe of leaf-cutter and resin bees.

The Megachilini is the most speciose tribe within Megachilidae, comprising four genera: Coelioxys Latreille, Megachile Latreille, Noteriades Cockerell and Radoszkowskiana Popov.  In spite of its high diversity and ubiquity, the phylogenetic relationships both within and among the genera are still obscure.

References

 http://onlinelibrary.wiley.com/doi/10.1111/zoj.12484/abstract

Megachilidae
Bee tribes